The Carmen IOOF Lodge No. 84 is an Odd Fellows building in Carmen, Oklahoma that was built in 1902. It has served historically as a professional building, as a clubhouse, and as a specialty store. It was listed in the National Register of Historic Places in 1984.

It is one of four historic, surviving Odd Fellows buildings in Alfalfa County that were subject of a 1983 study. The others are the Aline IOOF Lodge No. 263 in Aline, the
Carmen IOOF Home in Carmen, and the Cherokee IOOF Lodge No. 219 in Cherokee.

References

Clubhouses on the National Register of Historic Places in Oklahoma
Buildings and structures in Alfalfa County, Oklahoma
Odd Fellows buildings in Oklahoma
National Register of Historic Places in Alfalfa County, Oklahoma